Taylor Lord (born May 30, 1990) is a Canadian soccer player and coach who serves as an assistant coach for the men's soccer program at Seneca College.

Club career 
Lord began his professional career with Portugal FC of the Canadian Soccer League (CSL) in 2008. The following season he signed with the Serbian White Eagles FC, making his debut on June 4, 2010, in a match against the York Region Shooters. In 2010, he had a brief stint abroad in Germany with SV Morlautern, before returning to North America to sign with the Toronto Lynx of the Premier Development League. The Lynx concluded the season by finishing seventh in the Great Lakes Division, thus failing to reach a postseason berth.

When the PDL season came to a conclusion Lord returned to the CSL and signed with York Region Shooters. He made his debut for the club on August 28, 2011, against St. Catharines Wolves where he recorded his first goal of the season in a 4–1 victory. In 2012, he signed a contract with the Dayton Dutch Lions of the USL Pro. On February 13, 2013 Dayton announced the re-signing of Lord for the 2013 season. The Lions reached the playoffs for the first time in their history in the USL Pro, but were playoff run came to an end with a 1-0 defeat to the Richmond Kickers in the quarterfinals.

In 2014, he played in League1 Ontario with Durham United FC. He later signed with Darby FC, and in 2019 played with Unionville Milliken SC.

International career 
Lord made his debut for the Canada U-20 men's national soccer team on September 26, 2009 against the Rwanda national under-20 football team at the 2009 Jeux de la Francophonie. In total he made three appearances for the national team.

Managerial career 
In 2015, he was appointed as an assistant coach for Seneca Sting. He is currently on the Technical Staff for DeRo United Futbol Academy.

References

External links
 

1990 births
Living people
Association football defenders
Canadian soccer players
Soccer players from Toronto
Sportspeople from Scarborough, Toronto
Canadian expatriate soccer players
Expatriate footballers in Monaco
Canadian expatriate sportspeople in Monaco
Expatriate footballers in Germany
Canadian expatriate sportspeople in Germany
Expatriate soccer players in the United States
Canadian expatriate sportspeople in the United States
SC Toronto players
Serbian White Eagles FC players
Toronto Lynx players
York Region Shooters players
Dayton Dutch Lions players
Canadian Soccer League (1998–present) players
USL League Two players
USL Championship players
League1 Ontario players
Canada men's youth international soccer players
Darby FC players
Unionville Milliken SC players
Pickering FC players